Selena Shaikh (born 20 August 1992) is an Australian female professional squash player. As of July 2018, she is ranked 119 according to the PSA World rankings. 

In July 2018, she was appointed as the head coach at the Grace Park Hawthorn Squash Club, Melbourne.

References

External links 
 

1992 births
Living people
Australian female squash players
Sportspeople from Perth, Western Australia
21st-century Australian women